Kermit Independent School District is a public school district located in Kermit, Texas, United States that serves students in northeastern Winkler County and encompasses . The enrollment of the district was 1,235 at the beginning of the 2010–2011 school year.

In 2009, the school district was rated "academically acceptable" by the Texas Education Agency.

The district received national attention in January 2015 after a nine-year-old boy was controversially suspended because he "told a classmate he could make him disappear with a ring forged in fictional Middle Earth’s Mount Doom." The same boy had already been suspended on two previous occasions, which were also questioned by some in the public.

Schools
Kermit ISD has three campuses:

Kermit High School (Grades 9-12)
Kermit Junior High School (Grades 5-8)
Kermit Elementary School (Grades Pre K-4)

References

External links

School districts in Winkler County, Texas
1928 establishments in Texas
School districts established in 1928